Gerrit Jan Michaëlis (1775, Amsterdam – 1857, Haarlem), was an 18th-century painter from the Northern Netherlands.

Biography
He was the son of the sculptor H.C. Michaëlis who studied at the Koninklijke Academie voor Beeldende Kunsten (Amsterdam Royal Academy of Art) and became a member of the Amsterdam drawing society called "Tekengenootschap Zonder Wet of Spreuk". He was the pupil of George Nikolaus Ritter and Jurriaan Andriessen, and won a prize at the Amsterdam drawing academy Felix Meritis in 1805. He continued to send in examples of his art which met with success in Amsterdam competitions in the years 1808, 1810, 1813, 1814, 1816, and 1818.

He moved to Haarlem to succeed Wybrand Hendriks as the curator and live-in kastelein of the art collection at the Teylers Museum during the years 1819-1854. He is known for his landscapes and was also the director of the Haarlem Stadstekenacademie.

References

External links
 Gerrit Jan Michaëlis on Artnet
 His sketched portrait on the Rijksmuseum website by Jacob Ernst Marcus

1775 births
1857 deaths
18th-century Dutch painters
18th-century Dutch male artists
19th-century Dutch painters
Painters from Amsterdam
Dutch landscape painters
Dutch male painters
Teylers Museum
19th-century Dutch male artists